Apollo 11 is a 2019 American documentary film edited, produced and directed by Todd Douglas Miller. It focuses on the 1969 Apollo 11 mission, the first spaceflight from which men walked on the Moon. The film consists solely of archival footage, including 70 mm film previously unreleased to the public, and does not feature narration, interviews or modern recreations. The Saturn V rocket, Apollo crew consisting of Buzz Aldrin, Neil Armstrong, and Michael Collins, and Apollo program Earth-based mission operations engineers are prominently featured in the film.

The film premiered at the Sundance Film Festival on January 24, 2019, and was released theatrically in the United States by Neon on March 1, 2019. Apollo 11 received acclaim from critics and grossed $15 million. The film won a leading five awards at the 4th Critics' Choice Documentary Awards, including Best Documentary Feature. It also received five nominations at the 72nd Primetime Creative Arts Emmy Awards, including Outstanding Cinematography for a Nonfiction Program for Aldrin and Collins, winning three for its editing and sound.

Production

In late 2016, Todd Douglas Miller had recently completed work on The Last Steps, a documentary about Apollo 17, when British archivist and film editor Stephen Slater suggested making a similarly themed documentary for the upcoming 50th anniversary of Apollo 11. CNN Films subsequently became a partner in the film.  Miller's conception of the film was centered on a direct cinema approach. The final film contains no voice-over narration or interviews beyond what was available in the contemporary source material. Portions of the mission are illustrated by animated graphics depicting the parts of the Apollo spacecraft as line drawings, the designs of which are based on the cel-animated graphics in Theo Kamecke's 1971 documentary Moonwalk One. In addition, three wordless biographical sequences summarise the lives of Edwin Aldrin, Neil Armstrong and Michael Collins up to 1969 by means of family photographs and archive footage.

In May 2017, cooperation between Miller's production team, NASA, and the National Archives and Records Administration resulted in the discovery of unreleased 70 mm footage from the preparation, launch, mission control operations, recovery and post flight activities of Apollo 11. The large-format footage includes scenes from Launch Complex 39, spectators present for the launch, the launch of the Saturn V rocket, the recovery of astronauts Buzz Aldrin, Neil Armstrong, and Michael Collins and the Apollo 11 command module Columbia, and post-mission efforts aboard the USS Hornet. The documentary included this footage alongside conventional footage from 35 and 16 mm film, still photography, and closed-circuit television footage.

Miller's team used the facilities of Final Frame, a post-production firm in New York City, to make high-resolution digital scans of all reels depicting ground based activities that were available in the National Archives. Specialized climate-controlled vans were used to safely transport the archival material to and from College Park, Maryland. The production team sourced over 11,000 hours of audio recordings and hundreds of hours of video. Among the audio recordings were 30-track tapes of voice recordings at every Mission Control station. Ben Feist, a Canadian software engineer, wrote software to improve the fidelity of the newly available audio. Slater, who had synchronized audio recordings with silent 16 mm Mission Control footage in earlier projects, performed the task of synchronizing the audio and film. The production team was able to identify "Mother Country", a song by folk musician John Stewart, in Lunar Module voice recordings. The song was subsequently featured in the film.

Neon acquired worldwide theatrical distribution rights to the film in July 2018.

A 47-minute edit for exhibition in museum IMAX theaters Apollo 11: First Steps Edition includes extended large-format scenes that differ from the full-length documentary.

Soundtrack
A soundtrack album Apollo 11 (Original Motion Picture Soundtrack) composed by Matt Morton was released worldwide by Milan Records on digital download on March 8, 2019. Played entirely on electronic instruments actually available in 1969, the seventeen-track album was also released on CD on June 28 and vinyl on July 19, 2019.

Accuracy
The film took some liberties with the timeline of the mission.  For example, an incident occurred during the return voyage, on day 8 of the mission, involving the disconnection of Michael Collins's biomedical sensor (his impedance pneumograph), which led him to wisecrack, "I promise to let you know if I stop breathing," but this event is depicted in the film as happening during the approach to the Moon before the separation of the command module Columbia and Lunar Module Eagle.

Release

The world premiere of Apollo 11 took place in Salt Lake City at the Sundance Film Festival on January 24, 2019. It was given a limited release in the United States on March 1, 2019 in IMAX through Neon and was released in the United Kingdom on June 28, 2019 through Universal Pictures and Dogwoof.

Home media
Universal Pictures released Apollo 11 in the U.S. on digital download, DVD and Blu-ray on May 14, 2019. The discs have two extra features; a 3-minute featurette titled Apollo 11: Discovering the 65mm and a theatrical trailer. It was released on DVD, digital, Blu-ray and a 4K Ultra HD two-disc set in the United Kingdom on November 4, 2019 by Dogwoof.

Reception

Box office
In its opening weekend, Apollo 11 grossed $1.6 million from 120 IMAX theaters (a per-venue gross of $13,392), finishing 15th at the box office. In its second weekend, the film gave up most of its IMAX venues to newcomer Captain Marvel, but played in a total of 405 traditional theaters and made $1.3 million, finishing 10th at the box office. It continued to hold well in its third weekend, grossing $1.2 million from 588 theaters, just a 2% drop.

Critical response
Upon its premiere at the 2019 Sundance Film Festival, the film was acclaimed by critics, who mostly praised the quality of the film's footage. The website's critical consensus reads, "Edifying and inspiring in equal measure, Apollo 11 uses artfully repurposed archival footage to send audiences soaring back to a pivotal time in American history." On Metacritic, the film has a weighted average score of 88 out of 100, based on 34 critics, indicating "universal acclaim".

In a positive review for IndieWire, David Ehrlich complimented Miller's ability to make the Moon landing sequence feel unique and thrilling, and stated that the clarity of the footage "takes your breath away". In another positive review, Owen Gleiberman of Variety called the footage "quite spectacular", and many critics compared the documentary to Damien Chazelle's 2018 Neil Armstrong biopic First Man in their reviews. Glenn Kenny of The New York Times called the film "entirely awe-inspiring" and wrote, "Although we know how the mission turns out, the movie generates and maintains suspense. And it rekindles a crazy sense of wonder at, among other things, what one can do practically with trigonometry." Matt Zoller Seitz of RogerEbert.com gave the film four-out-of-four stars, calling the film "an adrenaline shot of wonder and skill.... Films this completely imagined and ecstatically realized are so rare that when one comes along, it makes most other movies, even the good ones, seem underachieving. Any information that you happen to absorb while viewing Apollo 11 is secondary to the visceral experience of looking at it and listening to it."

Accolades

See also
 Footprints on the Moon, a 1969 documentary film by Bill Gibson and Barry Coe, about the Apollo 11 mission
 Moonwalk One, a 1970 documentary film by Theo Kamecke
 For All Mankind, the Oscar-nominated 1989 documentary film by Al Reinert about the Apollo program (1969 – 1972) featuring the music of Brian Eno
 Apollo 11 in popular culture

Notes

References

External links
 
 
 
 
 Official trailer

2019 documentary films
2019 films
CNN Films films
Collage film
Neon (distributor) films
Documentary films about the space program of the United States
Apollo 11
Cultural depictions of Buzz Aldrin
Cultural depictions of Neil Armstrong
Films about astronauts
Films about the Apollo program
Cultural depictions of Michael Collins (astronaut)
Peabody Award-winning broadcasts
Primetime Emmy Award-winning broadcasts
2010s English-language films
2010s American films